The Hits Collection, Volume One is a greatest hits album by American rapper Jay-Z. It was released on November 22, 2010 by Def Jam Recordings and Roc Nation. Although greatest hits compilations of Jay-Z have been released internationally before, this was the first of its kind to be released in the United States, in which it was released in a standard edition, deluxe edition, collector's edition box set as well as a 3-disc deluxe vinyl. The album features four tracks from The Black Album, three from The Blueprint 3 and one from each of Jay's other solo albums dating back to Vol. 2... Hard Knock Life.

Title and packaging 
The Hits Collection, Volume One was Jay-Z's first greatest hits album to be released by Roc Nation, and is the only greatest hits album to be released so far in his career. The front packaging of the album cover features Jay-Z's signature diamond hands, which are a reference to his fifth studio album The Dynasty: Roc La Familia. The inside album sleeve contains a booklet with photos of Jay-Z throughout his career, song descriptions, as well as an opening acknowledgment from Jay-Z himself.

In the opening acknowledgement, Carter wrote:

Track listing

Charts

Certifications

References

2010 greatest hits albums
Jay-Z compilation albums
Def Jam Recordings compilation albums
Roc Nation compilation albums